The following is the list of episodes from the second season of the ABS-CBN primetime drama series Maging Sino Ka Man.

The season premiere aired on December 10, 2007.

A total of 78 episodes aired in this series. This list is ordered by the original airdates in the Philippines.

Series overview

Episodes

All airdates for each episode are those from the Philippines.

Week 1

Week 2

Week 3

Week 4

Week 5

Week 6

Week 7

Week 8

Week 9

Week 10

Week 11

Week 12

Week 13

Week 14

Week 15

Week 16

See also
Maging Sino Ka Man

References
Maging Sino Ka Man Season 2 Official Site
 Maging Sino Ka Man on ABS-CBN Now

Lists of Philippine drama television series episodes
Lists of soap opera episodes